Bayramiç District is a district of the Çanakkale Province of Turkey. Its seat is the town of Bayramiç. Its area is 1,204 km2, and its population is 29,136 (2021).

Composition
There is one municipality in Bayramiç District:
 Bayramiç

There are 75 villages in Bayramiç District:

 Ağaçköy
 Ahmetçeli
 Akpınar
 Alakeçi
 Alikabaklar
 Aşağışapcı
 Aşağışevik
 Bekirler
 Beşik
 Bezirganlar
 Bıyıklı
 Çalıdağı
 Çalıobaakçakıl
 Çatalçam
 Çavuşköy
 Çavuşlu
 Cazgirler
 Çiftlikköy
 Çırpılar
 Dağahmetçe
 Dağoba
 Daloba
 Doğancı
 Evciler
 Gedik
 Gökçeiçi
 Güzeltepe
 Hacıbekirler
 Hacıdervişler
 Hacıköy
 Işıkeli
 Karaibrahimler
 Karaköy
 Karıncalı
 Kaykılar
 Korucak
 Köseler
 Koşuburnutürkmenleri
 Köylü
 Külcüler
 Kurşunlu
 Kuşçayır
 Kutluoba
 Mollahasanlar
 Muratlar
 Nebiler
 Örenli
 Osmaniye
 Palamutoba
 Pınarbaşı
 Pıtıreli
 Saçaklı
 Saraycık
 Sarıdüz
 Sarıot
 Serhat
 Söğütgediği
 Toluklar
 Tongurlu
 Tülüler
 Türkmenli
 Üçyol
 Üzümlü
 Yahşieli
 Yanıklar
 Yassıbağ
 Yaylacık
 Yenice
 Yeniköy
 Yeşilköy
 Yiğitaliler
 Yukarışapçı
 Yukarışevik
 Zerdalilik
 Zeytinli

References

Districts of Çanakkale Province